Mae Suai is a district (amphoe) in the western part of Chiang Rai province, northern Thailand.

Geography

Neighboring districts are (from the northeast clockwise): Mueang Chiang Rai, Mae Lao, Phan, Wiang Pa Pao, Phrao, Chai Prakan, Fang, and Mae Ai of Chiang Mai province.

The Khun Tan Range stretches from north to south along the west side of the district. The Suai River, a tributary of the Lao River, gives its name to the district.

History
The district was created in 1905, when the districts Mueang Wiang Pa Pao and Mueang Phong were merged. Originally spelled แม่ซ่วย, the current spelling was adopted before 1917.

Administration

Central administration 
The district Mae Suai is subdivided into 7 subdistricts (Tambon), which are further subdivided into 131 administrative villages (Muban).

Local administration 
There are 3 subdistrict municipalities (Thesaban Tambon) in the district:
 Mae Suai consisting of parts of the subdistrict Mae Suai.
 Chedi Luang consisting of parts of the subdistrict Chedi Luang.
 Wiang Suai consisting of parts of the subdistrict Mae Suai.

There are 6 subdistrict administrative organizations (SAO) in the district:
 Pa Daet consisting of the complete subdistrict Pa Daet.
 Mae Phrik consisting of the complete subdistrict Mae Phrik.
 Si Thoi consisting of the complete subdistrict Si Thoi.
 Tha Ko consisting of the complete subdistrict Tha Ko.
 Wawi consisting of the complete subdistrict Wawi.
 Chedi Luang consisting of parts of the subdistrict Chedi Luang.

References

External links

amphoe.com

Mae Suai